Ethiopia is located in the Horn of Africa. It is bordered by Eritrea to the north, Djibouti and Somalia to the east, Sudan and South Sudan to the west, and Kenya to the south.

Elevation is generally highest just before the point of descent to the Great Rift Valley, which splits the plateau diagonally. A number of rivers cross the plateau; notably the Blue Nile rising from Lake Tana. The plateau gradually slopes to the lowlands of the Sudan on the west and the Somali-inhabited plains to the east. Ethiopia's westernmost locality is Pibor River opposite the Sudanese village of Denjok. Its easternmost locality lies along the eastern border of Dollo Zone opposite Puntland and Galmudug states.

Physical features

Geography 

Between the valley of the Upper Nile and Ethiopia's border with Sudan and South Sudan is a region of elevated plateaus from which rise the various tablelands and mountains that constitute the Ethiopian Highlands. On nearly every side, the walls of the plateaus rise abruptly from the plains, constituting outer mountain chains. The highlands are thus a clearly marked geographic division. In Eritrea, the eastern wall of this plateau runs parallel to the Red Sea from Ras Kasar (18° N) to Annesley Bay (also known as the Bay of Zula) (15° N).

About 9° N there is a break in the wall, through which the Awash River flows eastward. This second range sends a chain (the Ahmar Mountains) eastward toward the Gulf of Aden.

The two chief eastern ranges maintain a parallel course south by west, with a broad upland valley in between – in which valley are a series of lakes – to about 3° N, the outer (eastern) spurs of the plateau still keeping along the line of 40° E. The southern escarpment of the plateau is highly irregular, but has a general direction northwest and southeast from 6° N to 3° N. It overlooks the depression in which is Lake Turkana and – east of that lake – the southern Debub Omo Zone (part of the larger Southern Nations, Nationalities, and Peoples Region).

The western wall of the plateau from 6° N to 11° N is well marked and precipitous. North of 11° N the hills turn more to the east and fall more gradually to the East Sudanian savanna plains at their base. On its northern face, the plateau falls in terraces to the level of the eastern Sudan.

The eastern escarpment is the best defined of these outer ranges. Narrow and deep clefts, through which descend mountain torrents that lose themselves in the sandy soil of the Eritrean coast, afford means of reaching the plateau, or the easier route through the Awash Valley may be chosen. On surmounting this rocky barrier, the traveller finds that the encircling rampart rises little above the normal level of the plateau.

The physical aspect of the highlands is impressive. Many of the mountains are of unusual shape.

Characteristic of the country are the enormous fissures which divide it, formed over time by the erosive action of water. They are the valleys of the rivers, which rising on the uplands or mountain sides, have cut their way to the surrounding lowlands. Some of the valleys are of considerable width; in other cases the opposite walls of the gorges are but two or three hundred meters apart, and fall almost vertically thousands of meters, representing an erosion of many hundred thousands cubic metres of hard rock. One result of the action of the water has been the formation of numerous isolated flat-topped hills or small plateaus, known as ambas, with nearly perpendicular sides.

The highest peaks are found in the Semien and Bale ranges.

The Bale Mountains are separated from the larger part of the Ethiopian highlands by the Great Rift Valley, one of the longest and most profound chasms in Ethiopia. The highest peaks of that range include Tullu Demtu, the second-highest mountain in Ethiopia, Batu, Chilalo and Mount Kaka.

Parallel with the eastern escarpment are the heights of Biala, Mount Abuna Yosef, and Kollo, the last-named being southwest  of Magdala. Between Lake Tana and the eastern hills are Mounts Guna, and Uara Sahia, .

Below 10° N, the southern portion of the highlands has more open tableland than the northern portion and fewer lofty peaks.

East of the highlands towards the Red Sea there is a strip of lowland semi-desert, the Ethiopian xeric grasslands and shrublands.

Hydrology 

Most of the Ethiopian uplands have a decided slope to the northwest, so that nearly all the large rivers flow in that direction to the Nile, comprising some 85% of its water. Such are the Tekezé River in the north, the Abay in the center, and the Sobat in the south, and about four-fifths of the entire drainage is discharged through these three arteries. Another large river is the south-flowing Omo, with 14% of the entire drainage the largest river outside the above-mentioned three main arteries discharging to the west, and by far the main feeder of the endorheic Turkana Basin with Lake Turkana. The rest is carried off by the Awash, which runs out in the saline lacustrine district along the border with Djibouti; by the Shebelle River and the Jubba, which flow southeast through Somalia, though the Shebelle most often fails to reach the Indian Ocean.

In its lower course, the river is known by the Arabic name Setit.

In Sudan, the Setit is joined (at ) by the Atbarah, a river formed by several streams which rise in the mountains west and northwest of Lake Tana. The Gash or Mareb, which forms part of the border with Eritrea, is the most northerly of the highland rivers which flow toward the Nile valley. Its headwaters rise on the landward side of the eastern escarpment within 80 km of Annesley Bay on the Red Sea. It reaches the Sudanese plains near Kassala, beyond which place its waters are dissipated in the sandy soil. The Mareb is dry for a great part of the year, but like the Takazze is subject to sudden freshets during the rainy season. Only the left bank of the upper course of the river is in Ethiopian territory.

It first flows for  nearly due north to the south shore of Lake Tana. At the southeast corner the rim of the crater is, as it were, breached by a deep crevasse through which the Abay escapes, and here makes a great semicircular bend like that of the Tekezé, but in the reverse direction – east, south and north-west – down to the plains of Sennar, where it takes the name of Bahr-el-Azrak or Blue Nile.

The Abay has many tributaries. Of these, the Bashilo rises near Magdala and drains eastern Amhara; the Jamma rises near Ankober and drains northern Shoa; the Muger rises near Addis Ababa and drains south-western Shoa; the Didessa, the largest of the Abay's affluents, rises in the Kaffa hills and has a generally south-to-north course; the Dabus runs near the western edge of the plateau escarpment. All these are perennial rivers. The right-hand tributaries, rising mostly on the western sides of the plateau, have steep slopes and are generally torrential in character. The Beles, however, is perennial, and the Rahad and Dinder are important rivers in flood-time.

In the mountains and plateaus of Gambela and Kaffa in southwestern Ethiopia rise the Baro, Gelo, Akobo and other chief affluents of the Sobat tributary of the Nile. These rivers descend from the mountains in great falls, and like the other Ethiopian streams are unnavigable in their upper courses. The Baro on reaching the plain becomes, however, a navigable stream affording an open waterway to the Nile. The Baro, Pibor and Akobo form for  the western and southwestern frontiers of Ethiopia.

The chief river of Ethiopia flowing east is the Awash River (or Awasi), which rises in the Shewan uplands and makes a semicircular bend first southeast and then northeast. It reaches the Afar Depression through a broad breach in the eastern escarpment of the plateau, beyond which it is joined on its left bank by its chief affluent, the Germama (Kasam), and then trends round in the direction of the Gulf of Tadjoura.

In this lake the Awash river is lost. This remarkable phenomenon is explained by the position of Lake Abbe in the centre of a saline lacustrine depression several hundred meters below sea level. While most of the other lagoons are highly saline, with thick incrustations of salt round their margins, Lake Abbe remains fresh throughout the year, owing to the great body of water discharged into it by the Awash.

Another lacustrine region extends from the Shoan heights southwest to the Samburu (Lake Turkana) depression.

To the same system belongs the neighbouring Lake Turkana, which is larger than all the rest put together. This lake receives at its northern end the waters of the Omo, which rises in the Shoan highlands and is a perennial river with many affluents.

The chief rivers of Somalia, the Shebelle and the Jubba, rise on the southeastern slopes of the Ethiopian escarpment as the Shebelle, the Ganale Doria and the Dawa, and part of their course is through territory belonging to Ethiopia.

There are numerous hot springs in Ethiopia, such as Sodere.

Geology

The East African tableland is continued into Ethiopia. A pioneering study of the geology of Ethiopia was W. T. Blanford's work in 1870. More recent work has focused on the Afar Depression, due to its importance as one of two places on Earth where a mid-ocean ridge can be studied on land (the other is Iceland).

The following formations are represented:

 Sedimentary and metamorphic
 Recent: Coral, alluvium, sand
 Tertiary: Limestones of Harrar
 Jurassic: Antalo Limestones
 Triassic: Adigrat Sandstones
 Archaean: Gneisses, schists, slaty rocks
 Igneous
 Recent: Aden Volcanic Series
 Tertiary, Cretaceous: Magdala group
 Jurassic: Ashangi group
Archaean.– The metamorphic rocks compose the main mass of the tableland, and are exposed in every deep valley in Tigre and along the valley of the Blue Nile. Mica-schists form the prevalent rocks. Hornblende schists also occur and a compact feldspathic rock in the Suris defile. The folia of the schists strike north and south.

Triassic.– In the region of Adigrat the metamorphic rocks are invariably overlain by white and brown sandstones, unfossiliferous, and attaining a maximum thickness of 300 m. They are overlain by the fossiliferous limestones of the Antalo group. Around Chelga and Adigrat coal-bearing beds occur, which Blanford suggests may be of the same age as the coal-bearing strata of India. The Adigrat Sandstone possibly represents some portion of the Karoo System of South Africa.

Jurassic.– The fossiliferous Antalo Limestones are generally horizontal, but are in places much disturbed when interstratified with Mekelle Dolerite. The fossils are all characteristic Oolite forms and include species of Hemicidaris, Pholadomya, Ceromya, Trigonia and Alaria.

Igneous Rocks.– Above a height of  the country consists of bedded traps belonging to two distinct and unconformable groups. The lower (Ashangi group) consists of basalts and dolerites often amygdaloidal. Their relation to the Antalo limestones is uncertain, but Blanford considers them to be not later in age than the Oolite. The upper (Magdala group) contains much trachytic rock of considerable thickness, lying perfectly horizontally, and giving rise to a series of terraced ridges characteristic of central Ethiopia. They are interbedded with unfossiliferous sandstones and shales.

Of more recent date (probably Tertiary) are some igneous rocks, rich in alkalis, occurring in certain localities in southern Ethiopia. Of still more recent date are the basalts and ashes west of Massawa and around Annesley Bay and known as the Aden Volcanic Series. With regard to the older igneous rocks, the enormous amount they have suffered from denudation is a prominent feature.

Climate

The climate of Ethiopia and its dependent territories varies greatly. It is temperate on the plateau and hot in the lowlands. The country lies wholly within the tropics, but its nearness to the equator is counterbalanced by the elevation of the land. The weather is usually sunny and dry, but the short (belg) rains occur from February to April and the large (meher) rains from mid-June to mid-September. Over the greater part of Ethiopia as well as the Oromia highlands, the climate is very healthy and temperate. However, in the deep valleys of the Tekezé and Abay, and generally in places below , the conditions are tropical and diseases such as malaria are prevalent. The Somali Region and the Danakil Depression in the Afar Region have a hot, sunny and dry climate producing fully desert or semi-desert conditions. The terrain in the lower basin of the Sobat is hot, swampy and malarious.

In the uplands, the air is cool and bracing in summer, and in winter very bleak. On the higher mountains the climate is alpine in character. The atmosphere on the plateaus is exceedingly clear, so that objects are easily recognizable at great distances. In addition to the variation in climate dependent on elevation, the year may be divided into three seasons. Winter, or the cold season, lasts from October to February. It is followed by a dry hot period, which about the middle of June gives place to the rainy season. The rain is heaviest in the Tekezé basin in July and August.

In the former provinces of Gojjam and Welega, heavy rains continue till the middle of September. October is occasionally a wet month. There are also spring and winter rains; indeed rain often falls in every month of the year. But the rainy season proper, caused by the southwest monsoon, lasts from June to mid-September, and commencing in the north moves southward. In the region of the headwaters of the Sobat the rains begin earlier and last longer.

The rainy season is of great importance not only to Ethiopia but to the countries of the Nile valley, as the prosperity of the eastern Sudan and Egypt is largely dependent upon the rainfall. A season of light rain may be sufficient for the needs of Ethiopia, but there is little surplus water to find its way to the Nile; and a shortness of rain means a low Nile, as practically all the flood water of that river is derived from the Ethiopian tributaries.

Flora and fauna

Flora 
As in a day's journey the traveller may pass from tropical to almost Alpine conditions of climate, so great also is the range of the flora and fauna.
In the valleys and lowlands the vegetation is dense, but the general appearance of the plateaus is of a comparatively bare country with trees and bushes thinly scattered over it. The glens and ravines on the hillside are often thickly wooded, and offer a delightful contrast to the open downs.

These conditions are particularly characteristic of the northern regions; in the south the vegetation on the uplands is more luxuriant. Among the many varieties of trees and plants found are the date palm, mimosa, wild olive, giant sycamores, junipers and laurels, the myrrh and other gum trees (gnarled and stunted, these flourish most on the eastern foothills), a magnificent pine (the Natal yellow pine, which resists the attacks of the white ant), the fig, orange, lime, pomegranate, peach, apricot, banana, and other fruit trees; the grape vine (rare), blackberry, and raspberry; the cotton and indigo plants, and occasionally the sugar cane. There are in the south large forests of valuable timber trees; and the coffee plant is indigenous in the Kaffa country, whence it takes its name.

Many kinds of grasses and flowers abound. The flowers and the leaves of this plant are highly prized for medicinal purposes. The fruit of the hurarina, a tree found almost exclusively in Shoa, yields a black grain highly esteemed as a spice. On the tableland a great variety of cereals and vegetables are cultivated. A fibrous plant, known as the sansevieria, grows in a wild state in the semi-desert regions of the north and south-east.

Fauna 
In addition to the domestic animals enumerated below the fauna is very varied. Elephant can be found in certain low-lying districts, especially in the Sobat valley. The hippopotamus and crocodile inhabit the larger rivers flowing west, but are not found in the Hawash, in which, however, otters of large size are plentiful. Lions abound in the low countries and in Somaliland. In central Ethiopia the lion is no longer found except occasionally in the river valleys.

Leopards, both spotted and black, are numerous and often of great size; hyenas are found everywhere and are hardy and fierce; the lynx, African wolf, wild dog and jackal are also common. Boars and badgers are more rarely seen. The giraffe is found in the western districts, the zebra and wild ass frequent the lower plateaus and the rocky hills of the north. There are large herds of buffalo and antelope, and gazelles of many varieties and in great numbers are met with in most parts of the country.

Among the varieties are the greater and lesser kudu (both rather rare); the duiker, gemsbok, hartebeest, gerenuk (the most common—it has long thin legs and a camel-like neck); klipspringer, found on the high plateaus as well as in the lower districts; and the dik-dik, the smallest of the antelopes, its weight rarely exceeding , common in the low countries and the foothills. The African civet is found in many parts of Ethiopia, but chiefly in the Galla regions. Squirrels and hares are numerous, as are several kinds of monkeys, notably the guereza, gelada, guenon and dog-faced baboon.

Numerous eagles, vultures, hawks, bustards and other birds of prey live in Ethiopia, as well as partridges, guineafowl, sandgrouse, curlews, woodcock, snipe, pigeons, thrushes and swallows are very plentiful. A fine variety of ostrich is commonly found. Among the birds prized for their plumage are the marabou, crane, heron, blackbird, parrot and jays of extraordinary brilliance.

Among insects the most numerous and useful is the bee, honey everywhere constituting an important part of the food of the inhabitants. Of an opposite class is the locust. There are thousands of varieties of butterflies and other insects. Snakes are not numerous, but several species are venomous.

Natural resources and land use
Ethiopia has small reserves of gold, platinum, copper, potash, and natural gas. It has extensive hydropower potential.

Of the total land area, about 20 percent is under cultivation, although the amount of potentially arable land is larger. Only about 10 to 15 percent of the land area is presently covered by forest as a result of rapid deforestation during the last 30 years. Of the remainder, a large portion is used as pasturage. Some land is too rugged, dry, or infertile for agriculture or any other use.

Environmental issues

Disputed border

Eritrea

The border between Ethiopia and Eritrea has never been precisely demarcated. Between 1998 and 2000, the two countries fought a war over the issue, which involves quite small enclaves along the northern segment of their border, including the tiny village of Badme and the enclave of the Irob people. An international boundary commission delimited the border in 2002.

Although both nations agreed to accept its decision, Ethiopia has refused to accept the commission's findings in full, much to the consternation of the Eritrean government.

Somalia
The central section of Ethiopia's border with Somalia also has never been fully demarcated, and is only provisional.  Prior to 1950, the border between Somalia and Ethiopia was characterized by the 1908 Convention Line or Feerfeer-Dharkayn Geenyo Line.

Questions remain about the precise location of small parcels along the border with Sudan as well.

Statistics
 Location
 Eastern Africa, west of Somalia
 Geographic coordinates
 
 Map references
 Africa
 Area
 Total: 1,127,127 km²
 Land: 1,119,683 km²
 Water: 7,444 km²
 Land boundaries
 Total: 59,251 km
 Border countries: Djibouti 343 km, Eritrea 1,033 km, Kenya 867 km, Somalia 1,640 km, South Sudan 1,299 km and Sudan 744 km
 Coastline
 0 km (landlocked):
 Climate
 Tropical monsoon with wide topographic-induced variation
 Terrain
 High plateau with central mountain range divided by Great Rift Valley
 Elevation extremes
 Lowest point: Danakil, −125 m
 Highest point: Ras Dashen, 4,533 m
 Natural resources
 Small reserves of gold, platinum, copper, potash, natural gas, hydropower
 Land use
 Arable land: 15.35%
 Permanent crops: 1.14%
 Other: 83.51% (2012 est.)
 Irrigated land
 2,896 km² (2003)
 Total renewable water resources
 122 km3 (2011)
 Freshwater withdrawal (domestic/industrial/agricultural)
 total: 5.56 km3/yr (13%/1%/86%)
 per capita: 80.5 m3/yr (2005)
 Natural hazards
 Geologically active Great Rift Valley susceptible to earthquakes, volcanic eruptions; frequent droughts
 Environment – current issues
 Deforestation; overgrazing; soil erosion; desertification; water shortages in some areas from water-intensive farming and poor management
 Environment – international agreements
 Party to: Biodiversity, Climate Change, Desertification, Endangered Species, Hazardous Wastes, Ozone Layer Protection
 Signed, but not ratified: Environmental Modification, Law of the Sea, Nuclear Test Ban
 Geography – note
 Landlocked – entire coastline along the Red Sea was lost with the de jure independence of Eritrea on 24 May 1993

See also
 Ethiopia
 Extreme points of Ethiopia
 History of Ethiopia
 Index of Ethiopia-related articles
 List of lakes in Ethiopia
 List of mountains in Ethiopia
 List of rivers of Ethiopia
 List of volcanoes in Ethiopia
 Ilemi Triangle
 Mandera triangle

References

External links

Maps of Ethiopia – Perry–Castañeda Library Map Collection, University of Texas at Austin
The soil maps of Ethiopia, EuDASM
Ethiopia. The World Factbook. Central Intelligence Agency.
The mapping of Ethiopia Ethiopia-United States Mapping Mission web site
ETHIOPIA TOPOGRAPHIC MAPS  East View Cartographic web site
Ethiopia's government mapping agency, Ethiopian Mapping Authority web site